Louis Caravaque (Marseilles, 1684–1754, St. Petersburg) was  a French portrait painter who worked in Russia.

Life
Caravaque was born in Marseilles, in a family of a painter-decorator who specialised in painting ships from Gascony. Caravaque followed in his father's footsteps, starting work at the Arsenal Galeries in Marseille. In 1715 in Paris he attracted the attention of Peter Lefort with his portraits, with whom he concluded a contract to work in Russia for three years as a painter and with the additional obligation of training Russian pupils. He went to Russia, and  painted  a portrait of Peter the Great at Astrakhan in 1716 . Caravaque lived on Vasilyevsky Island near the Menshikov Palace, in his own house presented to him in 1722 by Peter I. He also lived in Moscow.

During Anna Ioannovna's reign, he was appointed "the first painter at court" (at first with a salary of 1500 rubles, later 2000 rubles a year), he painted her coronation portrait and took part in the decoration of the coronation celebrations. He remained as a goffmiller under Anna Leopoldovna and Elizaveta Petrovna. He became the author of the official "approved" image of Elisabeth as the new Empress. In May 1743 he was entrusted with a responsible order - to execute fourteen portraits of Elizabeth for Russian embassies abroad. He also participated in the decoration of her coronation.

He died in Russia St. Petersburg, on June 9, 1754.

Gallery

References

Sources

External links
 Tretyakov Gallery

18th-century French painters
French male painters
1684 births
1752 deaths
French portrait painters
Russian portrait painters
18th-century painters from the Russian Empire
Russian male painters
French emigrants to Russia
18th-century French male artists